The Pamirid race, also Pamir-Fergana race (Russian , named for the Pamir range and the Fergana valley), is the most Eastern subrace of the Europid race, a racial category is now considered to be obsolete.
It was said to be common in Central Asia, represented mostly by the Tajiks, Uyghurs and the Pamir people and  Uzbeks. Characterized by brachycephalic skull, dark hair, white skin (these characteristics are absent in the Pamir people and the mountain Tajiks), narrow protruding nose and fairly strong development of the tertiary hair cover.

During the Bronze Age, the Pamir-Fergana type was widely represented on the territory of Central Asia among the Indo-European population.

Classification 
In the late 19th and first three decades of the 20th century the most characteristic representatives of this race, the population of the Western Pamir, was attributed to the Eastern branch of the Alpine race. But in the early second decade of the 20th century, appeared a classification, that distinguishes this type as an independent race, standing in the same row with Armenoid, Dinaric, and Alpine races. Such theories were joined to the Soviet researchers of Central Asia in the 20-30-s.

In Le Razze e i popoli della terra, Renato Biasutti offers the Armenoid as a sub-type of the Pamirian (Anatolico-Pamirian).

Origin 
According to Ginzburg (1966), the Pamir-Fergana race was developed from intermixture of the two other Central Asian types: the Andronovo, which went through the process of gracilization (reduction of prominence of facial features), and a Central Asian variant of Mediterranean that became brachycephalic. According to Andrianov (1969, 1991), with the transition of Central Asian peoples from nomadic to agricultural lifestyle, parallel processes of anthropological mixing, on the one hand, brachycephalization and gracilization, on the other, could have occurred here. According to Khodjaev (1981), the Pamir-Fergana race has no ancient origin and is a result of intermixture between different races.

According to L.T. Yablonski, at the end of the 1st millennium BC, as a result of centuries of mixing processes among a wide variety of anthropological components, and above all, among descendants of hypomorphic, high-headed Europids and descendants of meso-brachycephalic, mesomorphic Europids with a slightly flattened facial skeleton the foundations for the plain version of the Pamir-Fergana race was created.

Bibliography 
 Ghinzburg V. The central Asian interfluvial race and its origin. // International Congress of Anthropological and Ethnological Sciences. 1968.
 Дубова Н.А. К проблеме формирования памиро-ферганской расы. // Сов.этнография. 1978 (Dubova N.A. The problem of formation of the Pamir-Ferghana race. / / Soviet ethnography. 1978)
 Гинзбург В.В, Древние и современные антропологические типы Средней Азии. . СССР.1951  (Ginzburg V.V., Ancient and modern anthropological types in Central Asia. USSR 1951)
 Гинзбург В.В., Трофимова Т.А. Палеоантропология Средней Азии. М.,1972. (Ginzburg V.V., Trofimova T.A. Paleoanthropology of Central Asia.1972.)
 Дубова Н.A. Антропологический состав таджиков Северного Таджикистана 1978 (Dubova N.A. Anthropology of the Tajiks of the Northern Tajikistan. 1978)
 Кияткина Т.П. К вопросу об антропологии древнего населения Хорезма. // Хорезм и Мухаммед ал-Хорезми в мировой истории и культуре. Душанбе, 1983. (Kiyatkin T.P. On the anthropology of the ancient population of Khorezm. / / Khorezm and Muhammad al-Khwarizmi in world history and culture. Dushanbe, 1983.)
 Кузьмина Е.Е. Рец.: О.А. Вишневская. «Культура сакских племен низовьев Сырдарьи VII-V вв. до н.э.». // Сов. археология. 1975 (Kuzmina E.E., O.A. Vishnevskaya. Culture of the Saka tribes in Lower Syrdarya in 7th–5th century BC 1975)
 Яблонский Л.Т. Проблемы этногенеза древнего населения Севера Средней Азии в эпоху бронзы. // Виноградов и др. «Древнейшее население низовьев Амударьи.1986г (Yablonsky L.T. Ethnogenesis problems of the ancient population of the North Central Asia in the Bronze Age. / / Vinogradov et al "ancient population of the Amu Darya.1986.)
 Яблонский Л. Т. Антропологические материалы к вопросу о древности возникновения расовых комплексов на территории Средней Азии. // Лингвистическая реконструкция и древнейшая история Востока. Тезисы и доклады конференции.1984. (Yablonsky, L.T., anthropological materials to the question of the antiquity of racial complexes on the territory of Central Asia. / / Linguistic reconstruction and the ancient history of the East. Abstracts and Papers Conference. 1984.)
 Ходжайов Т.К., Джуракулов М.Д. Антропология Средней Азии. Самарканд., 198 4(Khodjaev T.K., Dzhurakulov M.D. Anthropology of Central Asia. Samarkand., 1984)
 Ошанин Л.В. Данные к географическому распространению главнейших антропологических признаков население Средней Азии и опыт выявления основных расовых типов Средней Азии. // Tp.IV. Всесоюзного съезда зоологов, анатомов и гистологов. Киев, 1931. (Oshanin L.V. Data about geographic spread of the main features of anthropological populations of Central Asia and experience in identifying the major racial types in Central Asia. / / All-Union Congress of Zoologists, anatomists and histologist. Kiev, 1931)
 Алексеев В.П., Гохман И.И. Антропология Азиатской части СССР. М., 1984. (Alekseev V.P., Gokhman I.I. Anthropology of the Asian part of USSR. M., 1984.)
 30-м выпуск сборника "Расы и Народы" (2004 год) (30th edition of the book "Races and Peoples" 2004)
 Антропологический Словарь. редакция. Л.Т.Яблонский. М (Anthropological Dictionary. edition. L.T. Yablonsky.)

References

External links 
 Renato Biasutti on Caucasoid Subraces preserved at the Internet Archive

Historical definitions of race